Mallikarjuna Rao (13 December 1951 – 24 June 2008) was an Indian actor and comedian who worked in Telugu films.  Rao, popularly known as Battala Satti for his role in the movie Ladies Tailor. He has acted in many movies in Telugu, Tamil and Malayalam languages. He acted in around 375 Telugu movies over the last 25 years.

Early life
He was born in Kasimkota Anakapalle, Visakhapatnam district.

Career
Mallikarjuna Rao started his career in films in 1973. He became popular with role of 'Battala Sattigadu' in Ladies Tailor directed by Vamsi. Ladies Tailor, Hello Brother, Tammudu and Badri are some of the films in which he excelled audience with his comedy.

Telugu actor, writer Tanikella Bharani treats Mallikarjuna Rao as his guru and to his credit Mallikarjuna Rao introduced L.B. Sriram, actor cum writer to director Vamsi, who gave chance to LB Sriram in his movie. Mallikarjuna Rao was the general secretary of the Movie Artists Association. He also served as the chairman of Sri Venkateswara Swami temple in Srinagar colony, Hyderabad. He is one of the senior most comedians in Tollywood.

"Mallikarjuna Rao was not only a unique actor but also a good human being. He always tried to help others whenever he can," Chiranjeevi said. Several actors recalled the help they received from Rao, who was general secretary of Telugu Movie Artists Association (MAA). Rao was also the secretary of Telugu Desam Party's cultural wing. Party chief N Chandrababu Naidu conveyed his condolences to Rao's family members over the phone. Chief Minister Y S Rajasekhara Reddy too condoled the death of the popular comedian. Rao was survived by wife, two daughters and a son.

Death
He died of leukaemia on 24 June 2008 in Hyderabad.

Awards
 Nandi Award for Best Character Actor for Thammudu

Filmography
This is the filmography of the Indian actor, Mallikarjuna Rao.

 Kirayi Rowdylu (1981)
 Nagamalli
 Punyabhoomi Kallu Terichindi
 Bali danam (1982)
 Manchu Pallaki (1982)
 Sitaara (1984)
 Rustum (1984) as Gopayya
 Anveshana (1985) as Puliraju
 Preminchu Pellaadu (1985)
 Ladies Tailor (1987) as Battala Satti
 Aalaapana (1985)
 Swati Mutyam (1986)
 Chandamama Raave Bhargava Ramudu (1987)
 Lawyer Suhasini (1987)
 Bhanumati Gari Mogudu (1987)
 Swayam Krushi (1987)
 Shrutilayalu (1987)
 Sankeertana (1987)
 Sri Kanaka Mahalaxmi Recording Dance Troupe (1988)
 Bhale Dampatulu Varasudochhadu (1988)
 Anna Chellelu (1988) as Chitti  Babu
 Judgement Aakhari Kshanam Chettu Kinda Pleader (1989) as Yesupadam
 Gopala Rao Gaari Abbayi April 1st Vidudala (1991) as Chinna Rao
 Hai Hai Nayaka (1989)
 Bala Gopaludu (1989)
 Aarta Nadam Bhooporatam Chevilo Puvvu (1990) as Peon Appa Rao
 Kobbari Bondam (1991)
 Iddaru Pellala Muddula Police (1990)
 Edurinti Mogudu Pakkinti Pellam (1991)
 Donga Police Appula Appa Rao (1991) as Tata Rao
 Attintlo Adde Mogudu (1991)
 Sundarakanda (1992)
 Akka Mogudu 420 (1992)
 Parugo Parugu (1994)
 Madhavaiah Gari Manavadu Rajendrudu Gajendrudu (1993)
 Jamba Lakidi Pamba (1993)
 Detective Narada Rendilla Poojari Kokkoroko Joker (1993) as Subbaraju
 Nippu Ravva (1993)
 Abbaigaru (1993)
 Neeku 16 Naaku 18 M. Dharmaraju M.A. Gharana Alludu Hello Brother (1994)
 Sundaravadana! Subbalakshmi Moguda? (1994)
 Maga Rayudu (1994)
 Kishkindha Kanda Donga Rascal Prema & Co. (1994)
 Alibaba Aradajanu Dongalu (1994)
 Sisindri (1995)
 Vajram (1995)
 Taj Mahal (1995)
 Subha Sankalpam (1995)
 Sogasu Chuda Taramaa? (1995)
 Top Hero (1994) as Chitra's father
 Linga Babu Love Story Ketu Duplicate (1995)
 Ghatotkachudu (1995)
 Alluda Majaka (1995)
 Jagadeka Veerudu Topi Raja Sweety Roja (1996)
 Osi Naa Maradala Dongaata (1997)
 Aho Brahma Oho Shishya (1997)
 Aahvaanam (1997)
 Pattukondi Chooddaam Ramudochadu (1996)
 Intlo Illalu Vantintlo Priyuralu (1996)
 Vinodam (1996)
 Pelli (1997)
 Chilakkottudu (1997)
 Muddula Mogudu Annamayya (1997)
 Maa Nannaki Pelli (1997)
 Akkada Ammayi Ikkada Abbayi (1996) as Yesupadam
 Gokulamlo Seeta (1997)
 Subhakankshalu (1998)
 Pelli Pandiri (1998)
 Oka Chinna Maata (1997)
 Thaali (1997)
 Vamsanikokkadu (1996)
 Chinnabbulu Maa Aayana Bangaram Maavidaakulu (1998)
 Suryavamsam (1998)
 Pavitra Prema (1998)
 Gillikajjalu Wife of V. Varaprasad (1998)
 Pelli Kanuka (1998)
 Raja Hamsa Ooyala (1998)
 Suprabhatam Sneham Kosam (1999)
 Iddaru Mitrulu (1999)
 Harischandraa (1999)
 Maa Balaji (1999)
 Thammudu (1999) as Malli
 Ravoyi Chandamama (1999) as Mallaiah
 Alibaba Adbhuta Deepam Pilla Nachchindi Nuvvu Vastavani (2000)
 Badri (2000) as Manikantha
 Goppinti Alludu (2000)
 Navvuthu Bathakalira (2001)
 Bhadrachalam (2001)
 Dasu Ammo Bomma (2001)
 Maa Aayana Sundaraiah Ammo! Okato Tareekhu (2000)
 Nuvvu Naaku Nachav (2001)
 Maa Aavida Meedottu Mee Aavida Chala Manchidi Bava Nachadu (2001)
 Bhalevadivi Basu (2001) as Ammu Raju
 Preminchu (2001)
 Kalisi Naduddam Akasa Veedhilo (2001)
 Prema Sandadi Thank You Subba Rao (2001)
 Jabili (2001)
 Rahasyam (2001)
 Swarna Bharatam Veedekkadi Mogudandi Raghava Malli Malli Chudali (2002)
 Nenu Ninnu Premistunnanu Vachchinavaadu Suryudu Friends (2002)
 Trinetram Simharasi (2001)
 Vendi Mabbulu Tappu Chesi Pappu Koodu Sahasa Baludu Vichitra Koti Hai (2002)
 Raghava (2002)
 Avunu Valliddaru Ista Paddaru! (2002)
 Jenda (2002)
 Girl Friend (2002)
 Ramana (2002)
 Fools (2003)
 Johnny (2003) as Anthony
 Simhachalam (2003)
 Aadanthe Ado Type (2003)
 Ottesi Cheputunna (2003)
 Ninne Istapaddanu (2003)
 Donga Ramudu & Party (2003)
 Palnati Brahmanayudu (2003)
 Seetayya (2003)
 Nenu Pelliki Ready (2003)
 Preminchukunnam Pelliki Randi Maa Alludu Very Good (2003)
 Lakshmi Narasimha (2004)
 Swetha Naagu (2004)
 Varsham (2004)
 Malliswari (2004)
 143 (2004)
 Abbayi Premalo Paddadu Bhadradri Ramudu Venky (2004) as Jagadamba Chowdary (J.C.)
 Andaru Dongale Dorikite (2004)
 Kedi No. 1 (2004)
 Shatruvu Chanti (2004)
 Evadi Gola Vaadidhi (2005)
 Adirindayya Chandram (2005)
 Dhairyam (2005)
 Shravana Masam (2005)
 Sadaa Mee Sevalo (2005)
 Nuvvante Naakishtam (2005)
 Dhana 51 (2005)
 Kaadante Aunanile Chakram (2005)
 Athadu (2005)
 Nee Navve Chalu Pournami (2006) as Priest
 Veedhi (2006)
 Kithakithalu (2006)
 Maayajaalam (2006)
 Gopi - Goda Meedha Pilli (2006)
 Bhagyalakshmi Bumper Draw (2006)
 Sundaraniki Tondarekkuva Aadhi Lakshmi (2006)
 Annavaram (2006)
 Bangaru Konda Bhajantrilu (2007)
 Athili Sattibabu LKG (2007)
 Dubai Seenu (2007)
 Seema Sastri (2007)
 Navataram Allare Allari (2007)
 Yamagola Malli Modalayindi (2007)
 Raju Bhai (2007)
 Pellaindi Kaani (2007)
 Mantra (2007)
 Swagatam (2008)
 Krishnarjuna (2008)
 Bommana Brothers Chandana Sisters (2008)
 Rainbow (2008)
 Michael Madana Kamaraju (2008)
 Baladur (2008)
 Nenu Meeku Telusa...? (2008)
 Nava Vasantham (2007)
 Jalsa (2008)
 Bhale Dongalu (2008) as Kotaiah
 Pilla Dorikite Pelli Naa Anevaadu Mayagaadu (2011)

References

External links
 

1951 births
2008 deaths
Telugu male actors
Indian male comedians
Male actors in Telugu cinema
Indian male film actors
Telugu comedians
Nandi Award winners
People from Visakhapatnam district
Male actors from Andhra Pradesh
20th-century Indian male actors
21st-century Indian male actors
People from Uttarandhra
20th-century comedians